Supermind is a science fiction novel by A. E. van Vogt first published in complete form in 1977 by publisher DAW Books.  It is a fix-up of three earlier short stories published separately,  "Asylum", "The Proxy Intelligence" and "Research Alpha".

Plot
As with many van Vogt works, the novel uses a psychological element, in this case Intelligence Quotient or IQ. The novel shows various alien races whose social roles within the galaxy are based upon their IQ. The story also includes the concept that at certain IQ levels various effects become manifest. For instance, at IQs in the thousands, individuals gain complete control over their body, allowing them to move at extreme speeds.

The book has three distinct sections, corresponding to the three original stories.

In the first section, two fugitive members of the Dreegh race arrive on Earth. They are vampires and set up an underground base where they plan to call on the other Dreegh to invade Earth and use humanity as food. The two are concerned that a famous doctor living on Europa, Ungard, is actually a member of the galactic civilization that is tasked with protecting lesser races like humanity. Using their mental powers, they take control of a reporter, Bill Leigh, and send him to track down the doctor and his daughter. During the mission, Leigh "awakes" to find he is actually a member of the Great Galactics, a race formerly believed to have left the material realm. He easily kills the Dreegh.

In the second section, another Dreegh arrives at Europa and takes the Ungards hostage, along with Hanardy, the captain of a freighter that makes the Earth-Europa run. Several other Dreegh arrive, and they begin harvesting blood from the European public. Hanardy also turns out to be a supermind, this time a human boosted by Research Alpha. Using his mental powers, he propels the Dreegh thousands of light-years into space.

The third section takes place at Research Alpha, where one of the researchers is experimenting with a serum to rewrite human genetic code to create superminds. It follows a secretary as she undergoes two treatments, eventually reaching IQ 10,000 and gaining omniscience. The scientists at Research Alpha, members of the galactic civilization, become concerned with her power as it now outstrips their own. She is lured back to the laboratory, where she is told her role is to marry Bill Leigh and recreate the Great Galactics.

References

External links 
 http://www.andrew-may.com/asf/fixup.htm
 http://brianbookreviews.blogspot.com/2011/10/supermind-by-ae-van-vogt.html
 

1977 Canadian novels
1977 science fiction novels
Novels by A. E. van Vogt
DAW Books books